El Boassa is a 1944 Egyptian film. It is an adaptation of Victor Hugo's classic novel, Les Misérables. The film stars Amina Rizk and Abbas Fares.

Plot summary

Cast
 Saleh Abdel Hai
 Shafya Ahmed

References

External links 
 

1944 films
Films based on Les Misérables
Egyptian drama films
Egyptian black-and-white films
1944 drama films